Wiggins may refer to:

 Wiggins (Sherlock Holmes character)
 Wiggins (surname)
 Wiggins, Colorado, U.S.
 Wiggins, Leake County, Mississippi, U.S.
 Wiggins, Stone County, Mississippi, U.S.
 Wiggins Airways, an American cargo airline
 , a British cycling team

See also
 Wiggins Hill, a hamlet in Warwickshire, England
 Wiggins v. Smith, a 2003 United States Supreme Court case
 
 Wiggin, a surname